The 24th Annual Grammy Awards were held on February 24, 1982, at the Shrine Auditorium in Los Angeles, and were broadcast live on American television. The event recognized the accomplishments of musicians during the year 1981. Quincy Jones was the major recipient of awards with a total of five Grammys.

The much coveted Album of the Year award went to Jack Douglas,  John Lennon and Yoko Ono for Double Fantasy, and Song of the Year went to Donna Weiss and Jackie DeShannon for "Bette Davis Eyes".

Award winners 
Record of the Year
Val Garay (producer) & Kim Carnes for "Bette Davis Eyes"
Album of the Year
Jack Douglas (producer),  John Lennon & Yoko Ono (producers and artists) for Double Fantasy
Song of the Year
Donna Weiss & Jackie DeShannon (songwriters) for "Bette Davis Eyes" performed by Kim Carnes
Best New Artist
Sheena Easton

Children's
Best Recording for Children
Dennis Scott & Jim Henson (producers) for Sesame Country performed by The Muppets, Glen Campbell, Crystal Gayle, Loretta Lynn & Tanya Tucker

Classical
Best Classical Orchestral Recording
James Mallinson (producer), Georg Solti (conductor) & the Chicago Symphony Orchestra & Chorus for Mahler: Symphony No. 2 in C Minor
Best Classical Vocal Soloist Performance
Richard Bonynge (conductor), Marilyn Horne, Luciano Pavarotti, Joan Sutherland & the New York City Opera Orchestra for Live From Lincoln Center - Sutherland/Horne/Pavarotti
Best Opera Recording
James Mallinson (producer), Charles Mackerras (conductor), Jiri Zahradnicek, Ivo Žídek, Václav Zítek & the Vienna Philharmonic Orchestra for Janáček: From the House of the Dead 
Best Choral Performance (other than opera)
Neville Marriner (conductor) & the Academy of St Martin in the Fields & Chorus for Haydn: The Creation
Best Classical Performance - Instrumental Soloist or Soloists (with orchestra)
Zubin Mehta (conductor), Itzhak Perlman, Isaac Stern, Pinchas Zukerman & the New York Philharmonic for Isaac Stern 60th Anniversary Celebration
Best Classical Performance - Instrumental Soloist or Soloists (without orchestra)
Vladimir Horowitz for The Horowitz Concerts 1979/80
Best Chamber Music Performance
Vladimir Ashkenazy, Lynn Harrell & Itzhak Perlman for Tchaikovsky: Piano Trio in A Minor 
Best Classical Album
James Mallinson (producer), Georg Solti (conductor) & the Chicago Symphony Orchestra & Chorus for Mahler: Symphony No. 2 in C Minor

Comedy
Best Comedy Recording
Richard Pryor for Rev. Du Rite

Composing and arranging
Best Instrumental Composition
Mike Post (composer) for "The Theme From Hill Street Blues"
Best Album of Original Score Written for a Motion Picture or a Television Special
John Williams (composer) for Raiders of the Lost Ark
Best Instrumental Arrangement
Quincy Jones & Johnny Mandel (arrangers) for "Velas" performed by  Quincy Jones
Best Instrumental Arrangement Accompanying Vocal(s)
Jerry Hey & Quincy Jones (arrangers) for "Ai No Corrida" performed by Quincy Jones
Best Vocal Arrangement for Two or More Voices
Gene Puerling (arranger) for "A Nightingale Sang in Berkeley Square" performed by The Manhattan Transfer

Country
Best Country Vocal Performance, Female
Dolly Parton for "9 to 5"
Best Country Vocal Performance, Male
Ronnie Milsap for "(There's) No Gettin' Over Me"
Best Country Performance by a Duo or Group with Vocal
The Oak Ridge Boys for "Elvira"
Best Country Instrumental Performance
Chet Atkins for Country After All These Years
Best Country Song
Dolly Parton (songwriter) for "9 to 5"

Folk
Best Ethnic or Traditional Recording
There Must Be a Better World Somewhere-B.B.King

Gospel
Best Gospel Performance, Traditional 
The Masters V for The Masters V
Best Gospel Performance, Contemporary or Inspirational 
The Imperials for Priority
Best Soul Gospel Performance, Traditional
Al Green for The Lord Will Make a Way
Best Soul Gospel Performance, Contemporary
Andrae Crouch for Don't Give Up
Best Inspirational Performance
B.J. Thomas for Amazing Grace

Historical
Best Historical Album
Michael Brooks & George Spitzer (producers) for Hoagy Carmichael - From Stardust to Ole Buttermilk Sky

Jazz
Best Jazz Vocal Performance, Female
Ella Fitzgerald for Digital III at Montreux
Best Jazz Vocal Performance, Male
Al Jarreau for "(Round, Round, Round) Blue Rondo à la Turk"
Best Jazz Vocal Performance, Duo or Group
The Manhattan Transfer for "Until I Met You (Corner Pocket)"
Best Jazz Instrumental Performance, Soloist
John Coltrane for Bye Bye Blackbird
Best Instrumental Jazz Performance, Group
Chick Corea & Gary Burton for In Concert, Zürich, October 28, 1979
Best Jazz Instrumental Performance, Big Band
Gerry Mulligan for Walk on the Water
Best Jazz Fusion Performance, Vocal or Instrumental
Grover Washington, Jr. for Winelight

Latin
Best Latin Recording
Clare Fischer for "Guajira Pa la Jeva"

Musical show
Best Cast Show Album
Quincy Jones (producer) & Lena Horne for Lena Horne: The Lady and Her Music

Music video
Video of the Year
Michael Nesmith for Michael Nesmith in Elephant Parts

Packaging and notes
Best Album Package
Peter Corriston (art director) for Tattoo You performed by The Rolling Stones
Best Album Notes
Dan Morgenstern (notes writer) for  Erroll Garner - Master of the Keyboard performed by Erroll Garner

Pop
Best Pop Vocal Performance, Female
Lena Horne for Lena Horne: The Lady and Her Music 
Best Pop Vocal Performance, Male
Al Jarreau for Breakin' Away
Best Pop Performance by a Duo or Group with Vocal
The Manhattan Transfer for "The Boy from New York City"
Best Pop Instrumental Performance
Larry Carlton & Mike Post for "The Theme from Hill Street Blues"

Production and engineering
Best Engineered Recording, Non-Classical
Bill Schnee, Elliot Scheiner, Jerry Garszva & Roger Nichols (engineers) for Gaucho performed by Steely Dan
Best Engineered Recording, Classical
Andrew Kazdin, Edward (Bud) T. Graham, Ray Moore (engineers), Zubin Mehta (conductor),  Isaac Stern, Itzhak Perlman, Pinchas Zukerman, & the New York Philharmonic for Isaac Stern 60th Anniversary Celebration
Producer of the Year
Quincy Jones
Classical Producer of the Year
James Mallinson

R&B
Best R&B Vocal Performance, Female
Aretha Franklin for "Hold On I'm Comin'"
Best R&B Vocal Performance, Male
James Ingram for "One Hundred Ways"
Best R&B Performance by a Duo or Group with Vocal
Quincy Jones for The Dude
Best R&B Instrumental Performance
David Sanborn for "All I Need Is You"
Best Rhythm & Blues Song
Bill Withers, Ralph MacDonald & William Salter (songwriters) for "Just the Two of Us" performed by Grover Washington, Jr. & Bill Withers

Rock
Best Rock Vocal Performance, Female 
Pat Benatar for "Fire and Ice"
Best Rock Vocal Performance, Male
Rick Springfield for "Jessie's Girl"
Best Rock Performance by a Duo or Group with Vocal
The Police for "Don't Stand So Close To Me" 
Best Rock Instrumental Performance
The Police for "Behind My Camel"

Spoken
Best Spoken Word, Documentary or Drama Recording
Orson Welles for Donovan's Brain

References

External links
24th Grammy Awards, from the Internet Movie Database

 024
1982 in California
1982 music awards
1982 in Los Angeles
1982 in American music
Grammy
February 1982 events in the United States